Block 35 Cobblestone Alley is located in Little Rock, Arkansas. It was originally surfaced around 1889, and is one of the city's few surviving brick-paved alleys. It provides access to the rear of buildings facing President Clinton Boulevard. It was listed on the National Register of Historic Places in January, 2009.

It was listed as a featured property of the week in a program of the National Park Service that began in July, 2008.

References

1889 establishments in Arkansas
Cobbled streets
Downtown Little Rock, Arkansas
National Register of Historic Places in Little Rock, Arkansas
Roads on the National Register of Historic Places in Arkansas
Streets in Arkansas
Transportation in Little Rock, Arkansas